is a town located in Oshima Subprefecture, Hokkaido, Japan. In April 2017, the town had an estimated population of 28,514, with 13,639 households, and a density of 130 persons per km2. The total area is 216.61 km2.

Geography
Nanae is at the southern end of the Oshima Peninsula, about 16 km away from Hakodate.
Highest mountain:  1133m, a stratovolcano

History
1897: Nanae village and Iida village was merged to form Nanae village.
1902: Nanae village was merged with neighboring villages and became a Second Class Village.
1957: Nanae village became Nanae town.

Transportation
 Hakodate Main Line: Ōnakayama - Nanae - Oshima-Ōno(Hokuto) - Niyama - Ōnuma - Ōnuma-Kōen
 Hakodate Main Line (Sawara Branch Line): Ōnuma - Ikedaen - Nagareyama Onsen - Chōshiguchi
 Route 5

Education
 High school
 Hokkaido Nanae High School

Sister cities
   Concord, Massachusetts (United States)
   Miki, Kagawa (Japan)

See also
 Ōnuma Quasi-National Park

References

External links

Official Website 

Towns in Hokkaido